The Social Pirate is a 1919 American silent drama film directed by Dell Henderson and starring June Elvidge, Laura Burt and Ned Sparks.

Cast
 June Elvidge as 	Dolores Fernandez
 Laura Burt as Mrs. McBride
 Lillian Lawrence as 	Mrs. Ridgeway
 Winifred Leighton as 	Madge Ridgeway
 Alan Edwards as 	Bruce Ridgeway
 George MacQuarrie as Allen Hobington 
 Ned Sparks as 	Harry Barnes
 May Hopkins as 	Ann Muller
 Philip Van Loan as 	Señor Valdez
 Alex Shannon as 	Bill Hoffman
 Bertram Marburgh as 	Detective Mills

References

Bibliography
 Connelly, Robert B. The Silents: Silent Feature Films, 1910-36, Volume 40, Issue 2. December Press, 1998.
 Munden, Kenneth White. The American Film Institute Catalog of Motion Pictures Produced in the United States, Part 1. University of California Press, 1997.

External links
 

1919 films
1919 drama films
1910s English-language films
American silent feature films
Silent American drama films
American black-and-white films
Films directed by Dell Henderson
World Film Company films
1910s American films